Roy Hinson (born May 2, 1961) is a retired American professional basketball player who was selected by the Cleveland Cavaliers in the first round (20th pick overall) of the 1983 NBA draft. Hinson attended Franklin High School in Franklin Township, New Jersey. He then played his college career at Rutgers University in nearby New Brunswick. A 6'9" forward–center, Hinson played in eight NBA seasons from 1983 to 1991, for the Cavaliers, Philadelphia 76ers and New Jersey Nets.

Hinson's best year as a professional came during the 1985–86 season as a member of the Cavaliers, appearing in 82 games and averaging 19.6 points per game. He also participated in the 1986 NBA Slam Dunk Contest, finishing seventh out of eight contestants. In his NBA career, Hinson played in 507 games and scored a total of 7,206 points.

After his successful 1986 season he was traded to the Philadelphia 76ers for the Number 1 overall pick in the 1986 draft which became Brad Daugherty. He was never again able to reach the same height he had in Cleveland, later going to the Nets and then retiring.

References
Roy Hinson's NBA stats @ basketballreference.com

1961 births
Living people
20th-century African-American sportspeople
21st-century African-American people
African-American basketball players
American men's basketball players
Basketball players from Trenton, New Jersey
Centers (basketball)
Cleveland Cavaliers draft picks
Cleveland Cavaliers players
Franklin High School (New Jersey) alumni
New Jersey Nets players
Philadelphia 76ers players
Power forwards (basketball)
Rutgers Scarlet Knights men's basketball players
Sportspeople from Franklin Township, Somerset County, New Jersey